Ta-a mi, also known as Ta-a noodles or danzai noodles, is a type of snack found in Tainan, Taiwan. Also known as "Slack Season Ta-a Noodles", they originated in Tainan (in southern Taiwan), about 130 years ago. While the general recipe is well known, some of the spices and the proportions of the various ingredients (shrimp flavored soup, shrimp, coriander, and garlic) are well guarded secrets by the different restaurants/stands that serve it. While seemingly a simple snack, foodies from all over the world have given it substantial recognition. The normal serving size is usually small, being considered more of a snack than an entree.  It is also on the pricier side (relatively) at around NT$50 (US$1.60) for a small bowl.

Origin
Ta-a noodles are said to originate in the late Qing dynasty, around 1895. During the Tomb Sweeping Festival and summer season (July to September) each year in Taiwan, there are frequent typhoons, rendering fishing too dangerous. These "slack seasons" were known to fishermen as "small months" and the phrase "pass the small months" refers to enduring the slack seasons.

Hong Yutou (洪芋頭), a fisherman from Tainan, and descending from fishermen in Zhangzhou, Fujian, began to sell noodles when he was 20 years old. At first it was to earn money during the off-seasons but eventually became his primary occupation. In the beginning, he carried his noodles on shoulder poles and sold them on the street before setting up a small stall in front of the Tainan Chuisian Temple, with the Chinese characters written on lanterns. Hence the name "Slack Season Ta-a Noodles".

Production methods
Ingredients: "oil noodles", minced pork, prawn, bean sprouts, cilantro, black vinegar, garlic, soy sauce and egg.
Boil prawn heads to be used as the soup base 
Boil noodles and bean sprouts in hot water, while shaking them up and down
Pick up noodles and bean sprouts, put bean sprouts on the bowl first and then put noodles on the bean sprouts in bowl. Topped with minced pork and prawn.
Add the prawn head soup, and then add some seasoning to your taste: typically black vinegar, garlic and cilantro.
Also can be topped with an egg or pork ball

See also 

 Taiwanese cuisine
 Dandan noodles
 List of noodle dishes

Notes

References 
The information in this article is based on that in its Japanese equivalent.

Taiwanese cuisine
Chinese noodle dishes
Taiwanese noodle dishes